The 2013–14 Women's National Cricket League season was the 18th season of the Women's National Cricket League, the women's domestic limited overs cricket competition in Australia. The tournament started on 12 October 2013 and finished on 16 February 2014. Defending champions New South Wales Breakers won the tournament for the 16th time after topping the ladder at the conclusion of the round-robin stage and beating Victorian Spirit in the final. Nicole Bolton was the player of the series.

Ladder

Fixtures

Round-robin phase

Final

Statistics

Highest totals

Most runs

Most wickets

References

External links
 Series home at ESPNcricinfo

 
Women's National Cricket League seasons
 
Women's National Cricket League